Maggie Carey (born ) is an American film director,  screenwriter, producer and actress. She has directed comedy shorts for television, and she wrote and directed the 2013 film The To Do List.

Early life and education
Carey was raised in Boise, Idaho. She attended Jackson Elementary and West Junior High and graduated from Borah High School in 1993.

Of her high school experience, Carey said, "I was in every AP class possible. I played a ton of sports. I was in student council. I was an all-American soccer player." Carey was also a lifeguard at the Borah pool, an experience that would influence her film The To-Do List.

Carey attended the University of Idaho for a year, before being recruited to the University of Montana to play Division I soccer in the team's inaugural season. She was co-captain of the team, making 26 appearances as a defender and scoring one goal. She graduated from Montana with a bachelor's degree in English literature. Carey went on to earn an MFA degree in film production from the University of Texas at Austin.

Career
In 2007, Carey and Liz Cackowski created an online series called The Jeannie Tate Show.

Carey was a member of New York's Upright Citizens Brigade improvisation troupe. Carey performed with both the Upright Citizens Brigade Theatre in New York and Improv Olympics West in Los Angeles.

In 2011, Carey cowrote and directed sketches for four episodes of Funny or Die Presents called "Lady Refs" about female referees working youth soccer games. Carey wrote and directed the low budget sex comedy, The To Do List, which was released in 2013; the film is set in her home state of Idaho in 1993, featuring a lead character who is the same age as Carey was then.

Personal life
Carey married actor Bill Hader in 2006. They had met in Los Angeles, California, through a friend of Carey's from college. They have three daughters together.

Hader and Carey separated in 2017. Hader filed for divorce in December of that year. They reached a divorce settlement in March 2018 and the divorce was finalized three months later.

Filmography

As director and screenwriter
 The To Do List (2013)

As writer, director and/or producer
 The Sex Lives of College Girls (2021) ("The Surprise Party")
 Never Have I Ever (2021) ("...ruined someone's life")
 Mr. Mayor (2021–2022) ("Dodger Day"), ("Move Fast and Break Things"), ("Mayor Daddy")
 Mixed-ish (2020) ("It's Tricky")
 Sunnyside (2019) ("Mondale")
 Splitting Up Together (2019) ("China-Curious"), ("Melancholicky")
 Single Parents (2018) ("They Call Me Doctor BISCUITS!")
 I Feel Bad (2018) ("My Kid Has a Grownup")
 Champions (2018) ("Matt Bomer Poster")
 Barry (2018) ("Chapter Four: Commit to... You")
 A.P. Bio (2018–2019) ("Rosemary's Boyfriend"), ("Toledo's Top 100")
 Great News (2017) ("A Christmas Carol Wendelson")
 The Last Man on Earth (2017–2018) ("Point Person Knows Best"), ("Senor Clean")
 Unbreakable Kimmy Schmidt (2016–2019) ("Kimmy Walks Into a Bar!"), ("Kimmy Finds a Liar!")
 Brooklyn Nine-Nine (2016–2019) (3 episodes)
 Love (2016–2017) (3 episodes)
 Silicon Valley (2014) ("Fiduciary Duties")
 Funny or Die Presents (2011) (TV series) (four episodes)
 Suburban Bravery (2007) (short)
 The Jeannie Tate Show (2007) (TV series)
 Head in the Oven (2006) (TV series short)
 Jenny Clone (2005) (short)
 Soap Scum (2004) (short)
 Sun River Homestead (2002) (TV movie documentary short)
 Dance Club (2002) (short)
 Ladyporn (2001) (documentary)

As actress
 Rejected Pitches (2013) as Kathryn Bigelow (2 episodes)
 Cinema Six (2012) as Tina
 Human Giant (2008) as Jason's Mother
 Jenny Clone (2005) as Jenny
 Dance Club (2002) as Gloria
 Vacancy (2002) as Woman
 Occam's Razor: The Great Dialogues of Mindy (2001) as Brenda Gibson

See also
 List of female film and television directors

References

External links

1970s births
American television directors
American television producers
American television writers
American women film directors
American women screenwriters
Living people
University of Montana alumni
Moody College of Communication alumni
American women television directors
American women television producers
American women television writers
Writers from Boise, Idaho
Film directors from Idaho
Screenwriters from Idaho
Sportspeople from Boise, Idaho
American women's soccer players
Soccer players from Idaho
Women's association football defenders
Montana Lady Griz soccer players